The Taipei Metro C381 is the fifth and the latest generation of heavy-capacity electric multiple units on the Taipei Metro in Taipei, Taiwan. They are designed to increase the capacity of the expanded network with the opening of the Xinyi and Songshan lines.

A total of 24 6-car C381 trains were ordered from Kawasaki Heavy Industries and TRSC in 2010 and began operation in 2012. They are currently in service on Tamsui–Xinyi line and Songshan–Xindian line.

Overview
The Department of Rapid Transit Systems (DORTS) awarded new rolling stock contracts CR381 (for the Xinyi line) and CG391 (for the Songshan line) to Kawasaki Heavy Industries and the trains procured under these contracts were built from 2010 to 2011. In 2012, DORTS purchased another six-car trainset (under contract CD311A) for use on the Bannan line although this trainset was never used on the Bannan line and was instead used on the Songshan–Xindian line. The first 7 six-car trainsets were built by Kawasaki at its rolling stock plant at Hyōgo, Japan whereas the remainder were built domestically by the Taiwan Rolling Stock Company (TRSC) to support the domestic rail industry.

In addition to the production of vehicles, Kawasaki was also responsible for technical support, including the design, testing, manufacturing, assembly, transportation, integration testing, test run, supply of spare parts and maintenance tools, training, warranty services, related documents and other after-sales service matters. In May 2010, the first batch of completed cars arrived in Taiwan. Kawasaki personnel then performed various static and dynamic tests to ensure that the trains met the normal operating conditions before the trains were handed over to DORTS. The C381 trains finally began operations on 7 October 2012.

More than 50% of the parts of the C381 are identical to that of the C371; such parts include cab equipment, electromechanical systems, passenger service interfaces, detrainment doors, etc. Hence, the C381 can be considered as a successor to the C371.

Exterior
The biggest difference between the appearance of the C381 and its predecessors is the adoption of a more aerodynamic design for the FRP panel on the front. A skirt is also added under the anti-climbers. While the trains are also unpainted like the earlier trains, the blue stripe design was also overhauled and the DORTS logo re-positioned. A glass window is also added to the detrainment door although the detrainment door is still of the same design as that for the C371. Otherwise, the carbody design is the same as that for the older train types. Apart from the headlights which still use halogen lamps, all other lights are LED. Instead of the four ribbon barriers on previous Taipei Metro trains, the gangway connections have four small rectangular fall-prevention barriers, while each carriage has two similar fall-prevention barriers.

Interior 
The interior of the C381 is similar to that of its predecessors. It is made of FRP material and has a 45-minute fire and flame resistant design, but there are still many new changes. Notable, triplicated vertical stanchion poles (also adopted on the Kaohsiung MRT and Taoyuan Airport MRT) and a circular handrail is installed from the ceilings for more standing passengers to hold. The handrails adjacent to both sides of the door are now more curved and the draughtscreens also have a curved design. On the contrary, the overhead advertising panels protrude out. The fire extinguisher positions are also changed. For the first time, LCD information displays are also used in addition to the more conventional LED displays and indicators.

The interior gangway connections are modified versions of Taiwan Railways Administration EMU800 series trains that have a similar design.

Train formation
A complete six-car trainset consists of an identical twin set of one driving motor car (DM1), one trailer car (T) and one intermediate motor car (M2) permanently coupled together.
The configuration of a C381 trainset in revenue service is DM1–T–M2+M2–T–DM1.

Each car is assigned its own four-digit serial number, which ranges from x501 to x548.
 The first digit (the 'x' above) indicates the position of the car. Hence, DM1 cars use the number x=1, T cars x=2, and M2 cars x=3
 The other three digits are the identification number of the train the car is part of. A full-length train of six cars consists of two identification numbers, one for the first three cars, and another for the second three. The bigger number is always equal to the smaller number plus one, and the smaller number is always an odd number. For example, a train of six cars would have serial numbers 1501, 2501, 3501, 3502, 2502, and 1502, respectively.

See also
 Taipei Metro VAL256
 Taipei Metro C301
 Taipei Metro C321
 Taipei Metro C341
 Taipei Metro C371
 Taipei Metro BT370

References
This article incorporates information from the corresponding articles on the Japanese and Chinese Wikipedia's.

External links
Technical Specs (TRSC)

Electric multiple units of Taiwan
Taipei Metro
Kawasaki multiple units
750 V DC multiple units